Ciudanovița is a commune in Caraș-Severin County, western Romania with a population of 622 people. It is composed of two villages, Ciudanovița and Jitin (Dicsény).

According to the 2011 census, 92.24% of the population of Ciudanovița were ethnic Romanians and 1.37% were ethnic Romani.

Natives
  (1901–1970), sculptor

References

Communes in Caraș-Severin County
Localities in Romanian Banat
Place names of Slavic origin in Romania